The Smitley River is a river in the northernmost Pacific Ranges of the Coast Mountains in British Columbia, Canada, flowing southeast to join the Noeick River a few miles above its outlet into South Bentinck Arm.  The Smitley begins on the east flank of Mount Saugstad.

See also
List of British Columbia rivers

References

Rivers of the Pacific Ranges
Rivers of the Central Coast of British Columbia
Range 3 Coast Land District